Pralyetarskaya (Pralietarskaja) is a Minsk Metro station. Opened on 31 December 1990.

Gallery 

Minsk Metro stations
Railway stations opened in 1990